Denis Gremelmayr (born 16 August 1981) is an inactive German male tennis player. His career-high singles ranking is World No. 59, achieved in May 2008.

Glemelmayr was born in Heidelberg, Baden-Württemberg.  He reached the semifinals of Estoril, Barcelona and Los Angeles in 2008, losing to Roger Federer, Rafael Nadal and Andy Roddick respectively.

Performance timeline

Singles

ATP Challenger and ITF Futures finals

Singles: 20 (14–6)

Doubles: 10 (4–6)

External links
Official fanpage  

Gremelmayr world ranking history

1981 births
Living people
Sportspeople from Heidelberg
German male tennis players
Tennis people from Baden-Württemberg